Aaron Pargas Ojeda is a Puerto Rican politician and former mayor of Florida. Pargas is affiliated with the New Progressive Party (PNP) and served as mayor from 2005 to 2013.

References

Living people
Mayors of places in Puerto Rico
New Progressive Party (Puerto Rico) politicians
People from Florida, Puerto Rico
Year of birth missing (living people)